Rubert is a name of German and Catalan origin. It is a variant of Robert and Rupert.

People with the given name
 Rubert Martínez (born 1985), Cuban Olympic judoka
 Rubert Quijada (born 1989), Venezuelan footballer
 Rubert William Boyce (1863–1911), English pathologist and hygienist

People with the surname
 Gino Rubert (born 1969), Spanish artist
 Joaquín Bernardo Rubert (1772–1817), Spanish painter
 Johann Martin Rubert (c. 1614–1677), German composer
 Maria Rubert (born 1980), Spanish lawyer
 Maria Rubert de Ventós (born 1956), Spanish architect

References

Catalan-language surnames
Catalan masculine given names
German-language surnames
German masculine given names